Pornography in the Middle East has been somewhat minimally documented and researched by scholars.

Though broadcast of and internet access to pornography is restricted or banned in many countries in the region, widespread access to pornography is available via satellite dishes.

In Iran, Iraq, Saudi Arabia, the United Arab Emirates and almost all other countries in the Middle East, pornography is illegal. However, due to widespread Internet access (in particular, downloading programs) and the existence of a large-scale black market in Western films, a law in Iran was passed in mid-2007 by parliament but still required approval of the Guardian Council, producers of pornographic films face execution if found guilty.

Pornography is readily available for users in a handful of Middle Eastern nations, such as Turkey, Azerbaijan, Lebanon and Israel; and the production of pornography is also legal within Turkey, Lebanon, Azerbaijan, and Israel.

In September 2011, a Lebanese-Syrian gang involved in promoting pornographic movies was arrested by the Lebanese general security forces, according to Lebanon's National News Agency.  The group sold the films on DVDs to minors in various regions in Lebanon.

See also
 Pornography in Turkey
 The East is Blue

References

 
Middle Eastern culture